Morocco–United Kingdom relations are the bilateral relations that exist between the Kingdom of Morocco and the United Kingdom.

History

First exchanges 
According to some accounts, in the early 13th century, King John of England (1167–1216) sent an embassy to Almohad Sultan Muhammad al-Nasir (1199–1213) to request military support and an alliance against France. At home, King John was faced with a dire situation in which his barons revolted against him, he had been excommunicated by the Pope and France was threatening to invade. The embassy of three was led by Bishop Roger, and King John supposedly offered to convert to Islam and to pay a tribute to al-Nasir in exchange for his help. Al-Nasir apparently dismissed the proposal.

Anglo-Moroccan alliance 

Relations developed following the sailing of The Lion to Morocco in 1551. According to Richard Hakluyt, quoting Edmund Hogan, the ruler "Abdelmelech" (Abu Marwan Abd al-Malik I) bore "a greater affection to our Nation than to others because of our religion, which forbids the worship of Idols".

In 1585, the establishment of the English Barbary Company, trade developed between England and the Barbary states, especially Morocco. Diplomatic relations and an alliance were established between Elizabeth and the Barbary states. Queen Elizabeth I sent Roberts to Moroccan Sultan Ahmad al-Mansur to reside in Morocco and to obtain advantages for English traders.

England entered in a trading relationship with Morocco detrimental to Spain by selling armour, ammunition, timber and metal in exchange for Moroccan sugar, in spite of a Papal ban, prompting the Papal Nuncio in Spain to say of Elizabeth I: "there is no evil that is not devised by that woman, who, it is perfectly plain, succoured Mulocco (Abd al-Malik) with arms, and especially with artillery".

1600 embassy

In 1600, Abd al-Wahid bin Mas'ud, the principal secretary to Moroccan Sultan Mawlay Ahmad al-Mansur, visited England as an ambassador to the court of Queen Elizabeth I. Abd al-Wahid bin Mas'ud spent six months at the court of Elizabeth to negotiate an alliance against Spain. The Moroccan ruler wanted the help of an English fleet to invade Spain. Elizabeth refused but welcomed the embassy as a sign of insurance and instead accepted to establish commercial agreements. Elizabeth and Ahmad continued to discuss various plans for combined military operations, with Elizabeth requesting a payment of 100,000 pounds in advance to king Ahmad for the supply of a fleet and Ahmad asking for a tall ship to be sent to get the money. Discussions, however, remained inconclusive, and both rulers had died within two years of the embassy.

Later relations
The English Garrison of the Colony of Tangier was almost constantly under attack by locals who considered themselves mujahideen fighting a holy war. The Earl of Teviot and around 470 members of the garrison were killed in an ambush beside Jew's Hill. Although the attempt by Sultan Moulay Ismail of Morocco to seize the Tangier had been unsuccessful, a crippling blockade by the Jaysh al-Rifi ultimately forced the English to withdraw.

A treaty signed in 1728 extended the privileges, especially those pertaining to the safe-conduct of English nationals.

19th century 

In the 19th century, Edward Drummond-Hay and his son John Drummond-Hay served as the British consuls-general at Tangier for decades, shaping the country's policies and survival during the Scramble for Africa. The Anglo-Moroccan Accords, also known as the Anglo-Moroccan Treaties of Friendship, were signed on 9 December 1856. This helped prolong Morocco's independence, but reduced its ability to maintain royal trade monopolies within the country and reduced its ability to charge tariffs on foreign commerce. In 1861, Britain issued Morocco a £500,000 loan financed by private investors to help the Sultan pay off the war indemnity of the Hispano-Moroccan War.

Moroccan Embassy 
The Moroccan embassy is located in London.

 Ambassador Hakim Hajoui

United Kingdom Embassy 
The United Kingdom embassy is located in Rabat.

 Ambassador Simon Martin

See also
List of Ambassadors of Morocco to the United Kingdom
Anglo-Moroccan alliance
British Moroccans

Notes

References 
 Virginia Mason Vaughan Performing Blackness on English Stages, 1500–1800 Cambridge University Press, 2005 
 Allardyce Nicoll Shakespeare Survey. The Last Plays Cambridge University Press, 2002 
 George Cawston, Augustus Henry Keane, The Early Chartered Companies (A.D. 1296–1858) The Lawbook Exchange, Ltd., 2001 

 
Bilateral relations of the United Kingdom
United Kingdom